Ringgold Knoll is a mountain 9 nautical miles (17 km) south of Archer Point on the east side of Matusevich Glacier. On January 16, 1840, Lieutenant-Commandant Cadwalader Ringgold on the Porpoise, one of the ships of the United States Exploring Expedition (1838–42) under Wilkes, sighted a large dark mountain in this direction. It was named Ringgold's Knoll on the chart by Wilkes. In 1959 Phillip Law of ANARE (Australian National Antarctic Research Expeditions) made an investigation of features in the area. It was not possible to identify the feature sighted by Ringgold, but this mountain is in proper relationship to nearby Reynolds Peak and Eld Peak as indicated on Wilkes' chart. It was selected by Law of ANARE to perpetuate Wilkes' naming.
 

Mountains of Oates Land